Henry Wittenberg (September 18, 1918 – March 9, 2010) was an American wrestler and Olympic champion in freestyle wrestling. He won two Olympic medals and was the first American wrestler after 1908 to achieve this feat. Wittenberg at one point in his career had wrestled 300 matches without losing. He later taught wrestling at Yeshiva University and City College of New York for thirteen years. In 1977, he was inducted into the National Wrestling Hall of Fame as a Distinguished Member.

Biography 
Henry Wittenberg was born in Jersey City, New Jersey. He became an excellent wrestler despite not wrestling at Jersey City's William L. Dickinson High School, where he instead swam and played chess. As a student at City College of New York he did not even consider himself athletic. However, the wrestling coach, Joe Sapora, introduced him to the sport. By his junior year of college, he was placing in prestigious college tournaments. After college, Wittenberg entered eight AAU tournaments. He won all eight of them. In the AAU tournaments he did not lose a match. He wrestled over 300 matches in a row and did not lose a single one. Wittenberg was the co-captain of the CCNY wrestling team together with Stanley Graze in 1939.

In 1948, Wittenberg entered the 1948 Summer Olympics in London. He was wrestling at the weight class 191.5 pounds. In the semifinals, he tore muscle tendons in his chest. His coach did not want him to wrestle in the finals, but Wittenberg was stubborn and wrestled anyway. He ended up winning the gold medal match. When he returned to the Bronx, he received a hero's welcome.

Four years later, in 1952, Wittenberg competed in the 1952 Summer Olympics in Helsinki as the returning champion. He once again reached the final match of the Olympics. This time he lost the match, receiving the silver medal. He became the first American wrestler since 1908 to earn two Olympic medals.

Wittenberg also was studious. He earned a master's degree in health education at the Teachers College, Columbia University. Later, he became an officer in the New York City Police Department. He won five commendations of bravery while on the police force. He was actively involved in the Police Sports Association. He was also active in the establishment of the Maccabiah Games. These games are held every four years for Jewish athletes around the world.

Wittenberg coached the collegiate level wrestlers at Yeshiva University and City College of New York from 1967 to 1980. Additionally, he coached the 1968 Olympic team in Mexico City. Also, he wrote a best-selling book titled Isometric Exercises. It has been through five printings.

Wittenberg was the first inductee to the CCNY Alumni Varsity Association Hall of Fame. He was elected into the National Wrestling Hall of Fame in 1977.

From 1995 to 2015, Yeshiva University annually held a wrestling tournament for Yeshiva high schools across the country named in his honor. However, Yeshiva University cancelled their wrestling program in 2015, and the tournament is now hosted by the Yeshiva Wrestling Association at The Frisch School in Paramus, NJ. Wittenberg was inducted into the National Jewish Sports Hall of Fame and Museum on March 21, 1993, recognizing his gold medal-winning performances at the 1950 Maccabiah Games (in heavyweight freestyle) and the 1953 Maccabiah Games.

Olympics
Wittenberg competed at the 1948 Summer Olympics, where he earned an Olympic gold medal in freestyle wrestling in the light heavyweight division. He earned an Olympic silver medal at the 1952 Summer Olympics.

See also
List of select Jewish wrestlers

References

1918 births
2010 deaths
Jewish American sportspeople
Maccabiah Games gold medalists for the United States
Competitors at the 1950 Maccabiah Games
Competitors at the 1953 Maccabiah Games
Olympic gold medalists for the United States in wrestling
Olympic silver medalists for the United States in wrestling
Wrestlers at the 1948 Summer Olympics
Wrestlers at the 1952 Summer Olympics
American male sport wrestlers
Sportspeople from Jersey City, New Jersey
William L. Dickinson High School alumni
City College of New York alumni
Medalists at the 1952 Summer Olympics
Medalists at the 1948 Summer Olympics
Teachers College, Columbia University alumni
Maccabiah Games medalists in wrestling
Jewish wrestlers
International Jewish Sports Hall of Fame inductees
21st-century American Jews